The Musée des Beaux-Arts de Dijon is a museum of fine arts opened in 1787 in Dijon, France. It is one of the main and oldest museums of France. It is located in the historic city centre of Dijon and housed in the former ducal palace which was the headquarters of the Burgundy State in the 15th century. When the duchy was assimilated to the Kingdom of France, the palace became the house of the King. In the 17th century it became the Palace of the Dukes of Burgundy following a project by Jules Hardouin-Mansart.

Since 2006, the museum has been in a process of full renovation and extension. First, the work focused on one part including the renovated route “Middle-Ages – Renaissance”, inaugurated on September 7, 2013. The fully-renovated museum displaying 1500 works of art in 50 different rooms was inaugurated on May 17, 2019, in the presence of the Minister for Culture Franck Riester, the former French President François Hollande and the Mayor François Rebsamen.

History of the museum 

The museum was founded during the Age of Enlightenment on the order of the Estates of Burgundy on November 30, 1787, but the project dated from 1783 with the decision to build the eastern wing of the palace. The aim was to facilitate the teaching for the students of the art school by gathering works that could serve as models.

This original school was free and open to everyone. It was created by François Devosge on March 24, 1767. The museum was placed under the protection of the Estates of Burgundy and presented its collections in the Salon Condé, conceived as a gallery of paintings to celebrate the glory of the Grand Condé’s battles, and in the Statues Room or “Room of the Antiques” where copies of plaster and marble antiques could be found.

It is known for its collections in relation with the dukes of Burgundy, for the richness of its encyclopedic collections stretching from  Egyptian art to the 20th century as well as the historical interest of the building that holds them, the Palace of the Dukes of Burgundy.

The museum opened its doors to the public in 1799 and gradually spread out within the palace being enriched by imperial grants, deposits by the State, donations and legacies.

As one of the largest museums of France, le Musée des Beaux-Arts de Dijon is known for its rich collections of sculptures, paintings, art objects and various other items from the past.

Those interested in a specific historical age can admire various stunning items from Antiquity, Middle Ages, Renaissance as well as masterpieces stretching from the 17th century to the 21st century.

Among the attractions of the museum, you can find the tombs of Philippe le Hardi and Jean sans Peur, a collection of German and Swiss primitives (the most important in France) and a collection of French paintings, rich in artists dating back to the time of Louis XIV, not forgetting the collection of contemporary art.

The museum also holds extra-European collections, such as ceramic and Islamic glasses, weapons and oriental caskets, ancient ivories of Africa, everyday objects and African ceremonial masks, Chinese and Japanese porcelains, Korean stoneware, Tibetan and Indian sculptures and pre-Columbian ceramics.

Artworks 
The museum holds a large and varied collection of art:

 Various remains of the lavish court of the Dukes of Burgundy, including the famous tombs of Philip the Bold, John the Fearless and Margaret of Bavaria with their mourners from the Chartreuse of Champmol.
 A collection of Egyptian antiquities with a rare series of Fayum mummy portraits
 A collection of Roman art from Switzerland and Germany unique in France
 Some famous works from the Renaissance, 17th and 18th centuries, including works by Melchior Broederlam, Verrocchio, Robert Campin (known as the Master of Flémalle), Ambrogio Lorenzetti, Lorenzo Lotto, Titian, Jacopo Pontormo, Paolo Veronese, Jan Brueghel the Elder, Guido Reni, Georges de La Tour, Rubens, Philippe de Champaigne, Charles Le Brun, Jean-Baptiste Greuze, Hubert Robert
 A balanced representation of different currents of 19th century and a significant body of work of the sculptor Pompon
 A section of modern art including Granville gift: Théodore Géricault, Eugène Boudin, Claude Monet, Édouard Manet, Alfred Sisley, Georges Braque, Juan Gris, Georges Rouault
 Representative works of the school of Paris from 1950 to 1970 with Charles Lapicque, Vieira da Silva, Nicolas de Staël

Selected collection highlights

References

External links

Musée des Beaux-Arts de Dijon
Art museums established in 1787
Egyptological collections in France
FRAME Museums
Art museums and galleries in France
Museums in Dijon